× Eulocymbidiella, abbreviated in trade journals Eucmla, is an intergeneric hybrid between the orchid genera Cymbidiella and Eulophiella (Cymla × Eul).

References 

Orchid nothogenera
Eulophiinae